1985 saw the arrival of a new UMM car, the Alter 4x4, which featured a 2.5 litre diesel engine.

External links
 UMM's Official Website
 UMM's Unofficial French Site
 Portuguese UMM forum

Off-road vehicles
Cars of Portugal
Cars introduced in 1985
All-wheel-drive vehicles